Bruce John Robertson (born 9 April 1952) is a former New Zealand rugby union footballer. He played for Counties and the All Blacks. He played 34 tests (102 All Black matches) between 1972 and 1981, and scored 34 tries (4 test tries).

He played 135 matches for Counties  between 1971 and 1982, making his debut for the union at the age of 19. He was the All Black centre (No 13) for much of the 1970s, and was admired for his pace, silky pass and swerve, and his thinking approach to the game.

Robertson is regarded as one of the best centres in New Zealand rugby history. He did play against all-white South African teams during the Apartheid era, in common with many All Blacks at the time. However, he declared himself unable to play against the Springboks during the New Zealand 1981 tour. This was due to his 'personal abhorrence of apartheid,' following his tour of South Africa.

References

External links
All Blacks Profile

1952 births
Living people
New Zealand international rugby union players
New Zealand rugby union players
Rugby union centres
Counties Manukau rugby union players